Ishrat Made in China  is a 2022 Pakistani romantic action comedy film, co-written, produced and directed as a debut by Mohib Mirza, who also stars as the titular character Ishrat. The film was also co-directed by Parmesh Adiwal and Tehseen Khan. The film is a spin-off of the 2006 television comedy series "Ishrat Baji", also starring Mohib Mirza. The film was released on 3 March 2022 under the banners of Ek Alif Films and Eleven Eleven Films, while distributed by Geo Films and Eveready Pictures. It received negative reviews, and was a box office disaster.

Plot
The film is about a young man named Ishrat (Mohib) who goes to China in order to fulfill his dream. He then gets into some mishaps against the tyrant of a local gang.

Cast
 Mohib Mirza as Ishrat
 Sanam Saeed as Akhtar
 Sara Loren as Jia
 HSY as Master Mangshi
 Shamoon Abbasi as Master BP
 Mani as Naushad / Chunke
 Ali Kazmi as Shamshad / Chun
 Mustafa Chaudhry as Dilshad / Li
 Imam Syed as Jee
 Qais Shaukat as Subhan
 Shabbir Jan as Inspector Saab
 Nayyar Ejaz as Principal
 Parveen Akbar as Ishrat's Mom
 Laila Wasti as Nilofer
 Urooj Abbas as Minister Diesel Chandio
 Amir Yameen as Sabzi Wala
 Tara Mahmood as Neighbour
 Osama Bin Atiq as Sallu
 Ahsan Raza Firdousi as Ittefaq Ul Haq
 Faiza Saleem as Marjan
 Ramsha Akmal as Sheen
 Waseem Hassan Sheikh as Mr. Excuse Me
 Akhlaque Mahesar as Waderay Ka Beta
 Aadi Adeal Amjad as 1st Race Commentator
 Abis Raza as Barey Hakim Sahab
 Zarmeena Ikram as 1st Girl Accompanying Master Mangshi

The three actors above have played Dual role. Additionally, Aadi Adeal Amjad, Waqar Zaka, Faiza Saleem, Amir Yameen, Waseem Hassan Sheikh, Parveen Akbar, Zarmeena Ikram, Osama Bin Atiq, Tara Mahmood, Akhlaque Mahesar, Ramsha K. Akmal, and Abis Raza appear.

Production
Mohib Mirza announced on 20 January 2019 that he began the production of his new film, titled Ishrat Made in China. Script writer Ahsan Raza Firdousi revealed that the film has bits of Mirza's 2006 television series Ishrat Baji, but in completely different universe. The first filming spell was completed before March 2019 in Karachi, during which he performed his stunts himself and got injuries as well. A well physical training was received by him, including HSY and Sara Loren.

Second filming spell took place during 2 to 24 March 2020. While some of the cast and crew flew in there in late-February, and flew back on 18 March, a team of 21 members was stuck at a hotel in Kanchanaburi and they couldn't move to Bangkok for a safe travel due to the COVID-19 pandemic in Thailand. After a wrap-up of principal photography, the flight was being delayed from 25 March due to closure of airports, until 14 April 2020 when they flew back to Islamabad on a special flight of Pakistan International Airlines. After safely testing negative for the virus, they traveled in a bus to Karachi for post-production phase, thus utilizing an extra budget.

The soundtrack has been composed by Simaab Sen, Sami Khan, Shany Haider, and Talha Dar, while the former two are also lyricists along with Amit G and Ahmed Murtaza. The singers include Ali Noor, Sami Khan, Nayantara Rashmeet, Asad Raza Sonu, and Mohsin Afzal Sain. Action directors include Mehboob Shah, Pradit Seeluem, and David Simone. Rana Kamran has done the cinematography, while Shani Arshad be performed background score.

Soundtrack

Release
The names of the cast were officially revealed in June 2020, while being reported earlier also. After delays due to the COVID-19 pandemic in Pakistan, the teaser was released on 17 December 2021, and the official trailer on 13 February 2022.

The film premiered on 2 March in Nueplex Cinemas, Karachi, while it released on 3 March 2022 everywhere.

Notes

References

External links

2022 films
Pakistani action comedy films
Pakistani romantic comedy films
Geo Films films
2020s Urdu-language films
2022 action comedy films
2022 romantic comedy films
2022 directorial debut films
Films set in China
Films set in Karachi
Films shot in Karachi
Films shot in Thailand
Films postponed due to the COVID-19 pandemic
Films impacted by the COVID-19 pandemic
Urdu-language Pakistani films